Chaungzon may refer to several places in Burma:

Chaungzon -a town in Mon State
Chaungzon, Banmauk in Sagaing Region
Chaungzon, Homalin in Sagaing Region
Chaungzon, Kalewa in Sagaing Region